49 Belgrave Square is a Grade II* listed house in Belgrave Square, Belgravia, London.

It was finished in 1851, designed by Thomas Cubitt. In 1859, Mayhew & Knight built the entrance and added the octagonal lobby.

It was originally known as the "Independent North Mansion".

The first owner, Sidney Herbert, 1st Baron Herbert of Lea, named it "Belgrave Villa". His son, Sidney Herbert, 14th Earl of Pembroke, was born there in 1853. After Herbert, the Duke of Richmond lived there.

The house was subsequently acquired by Alfred Beit, and his brother Sir Otto Beit inherited it in 1906. His son Sir Alfred Beit, 2nd Baronet, grew up there and on his father's death in 1930 inherited the house, together with his large art collection. He relocated to Kensington Palace Gardens, and sold the house in 1936.

The building was acquired by Argentina in 1936, and has since been used as that country's Ambassador's official London residence. It has been opened to the public on one weekend a year since 2006, as part of Open House London, which notes the "sumptuous interiors still intact".

During the Second World War, the house became a meeting place and haven for Argentines who volunteered in the British forces, mostly as pilots.

References

External links

 Argentine Embassy in London

Grade II* listed buildings in the City of Westminster
Grade II* listed houses in London
Houses in the City of Westminster
Houses completed in 1851
Thomas Cubitt buildings
Diplomatic residences in London
Diplomatic missions of Argentina
1851 establishments in England